Julio Aumente (1921–2006) was a Spanish poet and writer.

Bibliography
The Air Does Not Return Madrid: Ignatius Press, 1955.
The Silences Madrid: Ignatius Press, 1958.
The Slope. Sark (1947 - 1965) Sevilla Calle del Aire, 1982.
Foyer (1981-1983, foreword by Luis Antonio de Villena, Madrid: Visor, 1983
Michele Green Laurel, Malaga Jarazmín, 1984.
Princes of Seville: Renaissance, 1990.
The Song of the Harpies, foreword by Luis Antonio de Villena. San Lorenzo de El Escorial: Libertarian-Prodhufi Publishing SA, 1993.
Of Goats or Psychic Love and Málaga: Department of Culture and Environment, Provincial Delegation, 1992
The Interview and Other poems, Córdoba: Journal of the Inn, 1994.
Collected Poems, 1955-1999, followed by the unpublished book Rollers, editing and foreword Inglada Rafael Luis Antonio de Villena. Madrid: Visor, 2004.

People from Córdoba, Spain
1921 births
2006 deaths
Spanish male poets
20th-century Spanish poets
20th-century Spanish male writers